Carrer d'Ausiàs Marc (sometimes written as Ausiàs March, see the Pompeu Fabra article for more information on spelling) is a street in Eixample, Barcelona, named after the Valencian poet of the same name.

It is located between Carrer de Casp and Carrer d'Alí Bei, crossing Dreta de l'Eixample from Plaça Urquinaona towards Carrer de Lepant.

Transport

Metro
 Urquinaona (L1, L4)

Bus lines
 Bus 10 Montbau - Pg. Marítim
 Bus 54 Estació del Nord - Campus Nord.	
 Nitbus N9 Pl. Portal de la Pau - Tiana (Edith Llaurador)

Education and culture

Schools
 IES Fort Pius
 Escola Mireia

Libraries
 Associació Orquestra de Cambra d'Amics dels Clàssics library.

Religious services

Catholic churches 
 Església Conventual Mare de Déu del Rosari

See also
List of streets and squares in Eixample

External links
City map of Barcelona

Streets in Barcelona
Eixample